In classical antiquity the god Pan was often venerated in caves. In the present these caves are often referred to as the Cave of Pan. 

In Greece:

The Cave of Pan on the northern slope of the Acropolis of Athens in Attica.
The Cave of Pan at Oinoe near Marathon in Attica.
The Corycian Cave on Mount Parnassus in Central Greece.
The Daphni Cave at Daphni Monastery near Athens in Attica.
The Davelis Cave on Mount Penteli near Athens in Attica.
The Phyle Cave on Mount Parnes near Fyli (Phyle) in Attica.
The Vari Cave on Mount Hymettus near Vari in Attica.
The Cave of Pan at Thasos

In other countries:
The Cave of Pan at Banias in the Golan Heights, controlled by Israel.

Pan cult sites